There are hundreds of long-distance footpaths in the United Kingdom designated in publications from public authorities, guidebooks and OS maps. They are mainly used for hiking and walking, but some may also be used, in whole or in part, for mountain biking and horse riding. Most are in rural landscapes, in varying terrain, some passing through National Parks and Areas of Outstanding Natural Beauty. There is no formal definition of a long-distance path, though the British Long Distance Walkers Association defines one as a route "20 miles [32 km] or more in length and mainly off-road." They usually follow existing rights of way, often over private land, joined together and sometimes waymarked to make a named route. Generally, the surface is not specially prepared, with rough ground, uneven surfaces and stiles, which can cause accessibility issues for people with disabilities. Exceptions to this can be converted railways, canal towpaths and some popular fell walking routes where stone-pitching and slabs have been laid to prevent erosion. Many long-distance footpaths are arranged around a particular theme such as one specific range of hills or a historical or geographical connection.

England and Wales: National Trails

National Trails are a network of long-distance paths in England and Wales (plus a small stretch of the Pennine Way in Scotland) funded by Natural England and Natural Resources Wales and maintained by local authorities under a Trail Partnership. The longest trail, the England Coast Path, is not complete though more sections are planned to open over the coming months and years, with a planned completion date of around 2024. The newest trail is the Coast to Coast Walk which will officially open in 2025. There are 83 million visits to the National Trails each year and over 80,000 people complete a trail.

* 
† 
‡

Scotland: Great Trails

Scotland's Great Trails are long-distance "people-powered" trails (predominantly hiking trails but including cycling, horse-riding and canoe routes) in Scotland. Scottish Natural Heritage maintains the official list of Scotland's Great Trails and is the custodian of the brand, but responsibility for creating and maintaining each route lies with each local authority through which a route passes, although Scottish Natural Heritage provides some of the finance and publicity. There are 29 routes, offering  of trails in total.

Each of the routes is clearly waymarked with a dedicated symbol, and run largely off-road. They are primarily intended for walkers, but may have sections suitable for cyclists and horse-riders. One of the trails, the Great Glen Canoe Trail, is designed for canoeists and kayakers.

Other UK long-distance paths
Some shorter paths linking between major walks (e.g. Maelor Way) are also included.

Southern England

Thames to Mersey

Northern England

Wales

Scotland

Cape Wrath Trail, runs around 300 km (186 mi) from Fort William to Cape Wrath; as the route is unwaymarked, different guides to it suggest slightly different routes. See here.
Central Scottish Way, 251 km (156 mi) from Milngavie to Byrness (just over the border in Northumberland, England)
Coast to Coast, 205 km (128 mi), Oban to St Andrews 128 miles, 
John o' Groats Trail, 231 km (145 mi) from Inverness to John o' Groats
Sir Walter Scott Way from Moffat, Dumfries and Galloway to Cockburnspath, Scottish Borders
The East Highland Way, runs from Fort William to Aviemore

Northern Ireland
Ulster Way, runs for  1023 km (636 mi), mainly in Northern Ireland, with some sections in the Republic of Ireland

The Macmillan Ways

The Macmillan Ways are a set of paths that promotes and raises money for the Macmillan Cancer Relief charity.

European walking routes 
Several European walking routes pass through the United Kingdom. They all use sections of UK long-distance paths.
E2 from Stranraer to Dover, with an alternative route to Harwich
E8 from Liverpool to Hull
E9 from Plymouth to Dover
The North Sea Trail covers seven countries with North Sea coastlines.

See also

Adventure travel for worldwide options
Backpacking and Ultralight backpacking
Hiking and Thru-hiking
Hillwalking
Land's End to John o' Groats
List of Conservation topics
List of long-distance trails
Long Distance Walkers Association
Raad ny Foillan, a long-distance path on the Isle of Man
Ramblers' Association
Scrambling
Walking in London
Walking in the United Kingdom

References

External links

Map of UK Long Distance Walks
Ramblers' Association: Paths and routes
Scotland's Great Trails
The Long Distance Walkers Association: Long distance paths database

 01
United Kingdom
Footpaths (long distance)
Footpaths (long distance)